Ectopsocus is a genus of psocoptera in the family Ectopsocidae.

Species 
There are about 172 currently recognised species, including: 
 Ectopsocus axillaris (Smithers, 1969)
 Ectopsocus briggsi McLachlan, 1899
 Ectopsocus californicus Banks, 1903
 Ectopsocus maindroni Badonnel, 1935
 Ectopsocus meridionalis Ribaga, 1904
 Ectopsocus petersi Smithers, 1978
 Ectopsocus pumilis Banks, 1920
 Ectopsocus richardsi Pearman, 1929
 Ectopsocus salpinx Thornton and Wong, 1968
 Ectopsocus strauchi Enderlein, 1906
 Ectopsocus thibaudi Badonnel, 1979
 Ectopsocus titschacki Jentsch, 1939
 Ectopsocus vachoni Badonnel, 1945

See also
 List of Ectopsocus species

External links 

Ectopsocidae
Psocomorpha genera